Wola Filipowska  is a village in Poland in Kraków County, Lesser Poland Voivodeship. In the years 1975-1998 it was in Kraków Voivodeship. Wola Filipowska is a small village on the road from Kraków to Trzebinia and is located by the Dulówka river.
Religions: Roman Catholicism (The Church), Jehovah's Witnesses (1%).

References

Villages in Kraków County